Donna Wilkins (née Loffhagen) (born 29 April 1978 in Christchurch, New Zealand) is a New Zealand representative in netball and basketball. She married Southland farmer Mike Wilkins on 17 March 2007. Wilkins returned to the Southern Steel for the 2012 season, after a short stint with the Canterbury Tactix in 2011.

Netball
Wilkins has represented the New Zealand Silver Ferns 56 times, making her 50th cap against Barbados in Auckland, New Zealand. The 1.85 cm, Goal Attack and Goal Shoot, started her career for Canterbury in the National Championships in 1994 as a cool sixteen-year-old. She carried on playing for the province until called into the Silver Ferns in 1996. After four years playing top netball in Canterbury, Donna Wilkins signed with the Southland netball team for the 1997 season along with fellow Silver Ferns captain Bernice Mene. She shot the southerners into fourth place overall in the championships, a much improved performance of 10th the year before.

After Netball New Zealand announced plans for a new semi-professional franchise competition for 1998 season to replace the old provincial champs, the new Invercargill based franchise the Southern Sting retained Wilkins services along with Bernice Mene for the season.

During the season Wilkins had scored 38 out of 51 goals against Otago Rebels but eventually lost the championship 57 to 51.

She continued to play in the South for the Southern Sting till 2006, when she was called into the Suns basketball team in the American WNBA basketball competition. She returned for the Stings semi final and final game during which she led them to win the semi final game 64–41 against the Northern Force along with the final winning over Waikato Bay of Plenty Magic in the 2007 National Bank Cup with a score of 48–46.

The Sting won seven out of the ten National Bank Cup titles, being named as one of the world's best sporting teams. Other big names to play for the franchise include: Bernice Mene, Tania Dalton, Megan Hutton, Belinda Colling, Leana de Bruin, Liana Leota, Adine Wilson, Lesley Rumball, Naomi Siddall, Wendy Frew, Erika Burgess, Daneka Wipiiti and Natalie Avellino.

In 2008 a new trans-Tasman semi-professional league was launched, the ANZ Championship. Wilkins did not play in the first season due to pregnancy, but continued with the Southern Steel as an assistant coach. She returned to the playing lineup for the 2009 season, where the Steel improved on their 2008 standing to reach the finals stage; the Steel were eventually defeated by the Adelaide Thunderbirds in the semi-finals. Later that month, Wilkins announced that she would not be returning to the Steel in 2010.

Wilkins turned out for the Canterbury Tactix in 2011, and for the next season returned to Southern Steel which she did with family help.

As a member of the New Zealand national netball team, Loffhagen won two Commonwealth Games silver medals, at Kuala Lumpur in 1998 and Manchester in 2002.

Basketball
Wilkins formerly played for Canterbury in the NZ Women's Basketball League. In Australia, she played two seasons with the Canberra Capitals in the WNBL. Prior to joining with the Canberra Capitals she also was on the Christchurch Sirens which won 76–55 against Dandenong Rangers and earned her a Most Valuable Player award. In 2006, she signed for the Connecticut Suns in the US WNBA.

As of 2006, Wilkins had 95 caps for New Zealand national team, including the 2000 Summer Olympics in Sydney, the 2004 Summer Olympics in Athens (where she played for Tall Ferns), and the 2006 Commonwealth Games in Melbourne (as captain).

References

1978 births
Living people
New Zealand netball players
New Zealand international netball players
1999 World Netball Championships players
Commonwealth Games medallists in netball
Commonwealth Games medallists in basketball
Commonwealth Games silver medallists for New Zealand
Netball players at the 1998 Commonwealth Games
Netball players at the 2002 Commonwealth Games
New Zealand women's basketball players
Expatriate basketball people in Australia
Olympic basketball players of New Zealand
Basketball players at the 2000 Summer Olympics
Basketball players at the 2004 Summer Olympics
Basketball players at the 2006 Commonwealth Games
Southern Steel players
Mainland Tactix players
ANZ Championship players
Canberra Capitals players
Netball players from Christchurch
Sportspeople from Christchurch
People educated at Rangiora High School
Southern Steel coaches
Central Pulse players
Southern Sting players
Medallists at the 1998 Commonwealth Games
Medallists at the 2002 Commonwealth Games